Venkatswamy Suryaprakash Thilak Naidu (born 27 January 1978 in Bangalore, Karnataka)) is an Indian first-class cricketer who played for Karnataka cricket team. He was a right-handed wicket-keeper batsman.

He played 93 first-class matches between 1998–99 and 2009-10 as wicket-keeper in which he took 220 catches and did 27 stumpings along with 4386 runs at an average of 34.80.

References

External links
 
 

1978 births
Living people
Indian cricketers
People from Harare
Karnataka cricketers
South Zone cricketers